Woodrow Wilson Davis (April 25, 1913 – July 18, 1999), nicknamed "Babe", was a Major League Baseball pitcher who played in two games for the Detroit Tigers in .

External links

1913 births
1999 deaths
Brewton–Parker Barons baseball players
Detroit Tigers players
Major League Baseball pitchers
Baseball players from Georgia (U.S. state)
Valdosta Trojans players
Jacksonville Tars players
Toronto Maple Leafs (International League) players
Zanesville Greys players
New Orleans Pelicans (baseball) players
Galveston Buccaneers players
Cordele Reds players